Mizdarkhan is a necropolis and archeological site in Karakalpakstan, an autonomous republic within Uzbekistan. Founded in the 4th century BC, it was inhabited for approximately 1,700 years, after which it was used as a sacred burial site.

History 
Founded in the 4th century BC, Mizadarkhan was once the second-largest city in Khorezm after Konye Urgench. A local legend says it is the burial site of Adam, which may account for its sacred status in ancient times.
Mizdarkhan was built close to an older city of fire-worshippers, and Zoroastrianism was practiced here, too. In the medieval period, Zoroastrian and Islamic traditions entwined, as is evidenced by burial sites which have been excavated. 

Mizdarkhan thrived until the 14th century when Timur led three campaigns against Khorezm. He attacked Mizdarkhan and reduced it to rubble, and after this the city was depopulated and used solely as a burial place. Most of the mausoleums and the small mosque which are visible today date from this period.

Main sites 
The complex of monuments at Mizdarkhan is located on three hills close to the village of Khodjeyli. There are remnants of a fortress with walls 10m thick, which creates a strong impression of how prosperous and well defended the city once would have been. Within these fortified walls are the ruins of two important buildings, a fire temple and a palace.

Opposite the fortressis a hill with the original Zoroastrian cemetery. Unlike Muslims, Zoroastrians didn’t bury their dead, but rather left the bodies to be consumed by birds of prey on top of a flat roofed tower called a dakhma. They then put the clean bones into ossuaries, a number of which have been discovered here.

The grave associated with Adam is beneath a mud brick mausoleum. Local legend says that a brick falls from the structure every year, and when the last brick has fallen, the world will end. In order to protect mankind from this event, pilgrims place additional bricks on the structure when they visit, ensuring it stays standing.

On the western edge of Mizdarkhan the 11th-century tomb of Yusup Ishan and a number of other grand mausoleums dating from the medieval period. These are Muslim burial sites, and some of the mausoleums have beautiful decorative tiles.

References 

Archaeological sites in Uzbekistan